Year 963 (CMLXIII) was a common year starting on Thursday (link will display the full calendar) of the Julian calendar.

Events 
 By place 

 Byzantine Empire 
 March 15 – Emperor Romanos II dies at age 25, probably of poison administered by his wife, Empress Theophano. He is succeeded by his infant son Basil II.  Theophano becomes regent and de facto ruler, naming her other son Constantine VIII (only 3 years old) as co-emperor of the Byzantine Empire.
 July 2 – Nikephoros II Phokas is proclaimed emperor by his troops in Caesarea. He sends a fleet to secure the Bosphorus Strait against his enemies. Chief minister Joseph Bringas gathers support and closes the gates of Constantinople. General Marianos Argyros is killed in a riot, forcing Bringas to flee.
 August 16 – Nikephoros II makes a triumphal entry in Constantinople and is hailed as 'the conqueror'. He is crowned emperor in Hagia Sophia.
 September 20 – Nikephoros II marries the former Byzantine consort Theophano, the widow of Emperor Romanos II, bolstering his legitimacy.

 Europe 
 Gero I, margrave of Merseburg, campaigns against the Slavs. He forces Prince Mieszko I of the Polans in Poland to pay tribute to Emperor Otto I (the Great). He expands his territory, the Marca Geronis (March of Gero), to the mouth of the Oder River.
 Sviatoslav I, Grand Prince of Kiev, begins a 2-year campaign in which he will defeat Khazar forces along the Don River – vanquish the Ossetes and the Circassians in the northern Caucasus. He also successfully attacks the Bulgars on the Volga River.
 November – Otto arrives at Rome; Pope John XII and Adalbert II (co-ruler of Italy) flee to Campania, taking with them most of the Papal treasury. Otto is warmly received by the Roman citizens as 'liberator'.
 December – King Berengar II (the father of Adalbert II) surrenders at the fortress of Montefeltro to German forces. He and his wife Willa are taken prisoner, and dispatched to Bamberg.
 Luxembourg has her beginnings at Luxembourg Castle (located on the Bock), founded by Sigfried, count of the Ardennes.

 Asia 
 The Chinese government of the Song Dynasty attempts to ban the practice of cremation; despite this decree, the lower and middle classes continue to cremate their dead, until the government resolves the problem in the 12th century, by establishing public graveyards for paupers.
 The Nanping State, one of the Ten Kingdoms in south-central China, is forced to surrender, when invaded by armies of the Song Dynasty.

 By topic 
 Religion 
 November 6 – Synod of Rome: Otto I calls a council at St. Peter's Basilica. John XII is deposed on charges that he has conducted himself dishonorably and instigated an armed rebellion against Otto. 
 December 6 – Pope Leo VIII is appointed to the office of Protonotary and begins his papacy as antipope of Rome – a reign with the concurrently deposed John XII.
 The Monastery of Great Lavra at Mount Athos (northeastern Greece) is founded by the Byzantine monk Athanasius the Athonite.

Births 
 March 13 – Anna Porphyrogenita, Grand Princess of Kiev (d. 1011)
 Edith of Wilton, English princess and abbess (approximate date)
 Li Jiqian, Chinese governor and rebel leader (d. 1004)
 Nuh II, emir of the Samanid Dynasty (Iran) (d. 997)
 Samsam al-Dawla, Buyid emir (approximate date)
 Snorri Goði, Icelandic Viking chieftain (d. 1031)

Deaths 
 March 15 – Romanos II, Byzantine emperor (b. 938)
 March 31 – Abu Ja'far Ahmad ibn Muhammad, Saffarid emir (b. 906)
 April 3 – William III, duke of Aquitaine (b. 915)
 April 10 – Oda of Metz, German noblewoman
 April 16 – William I, German nobleman
 April 18 – Stephen Lekapenos, Byzantine co-emperor
 August 16 – Marianos Argyros, Byzantine general
 Abu Muhammad al-Hasan, Buyid vizier
 Alp-Tegin, Samanid commander-in-chief
 Donnchad mac Cellacháin, king of Munster (Ireland)
 Fothad I, bishop of St. Andrews (approximate date)
 Goltregoda, Frankish countess and regent (b. 920)
 Ingeborg Tryggvasdotter, Viking noblewoman
 John II, duke of Gaeta (Italy) (approximate date)
 Michael Maleinos, Byzantine monk (approximate date)
 Ordoño IV (the Bad), king of León (or 962)
 Rudolfe II (or Raoul), Frankish nobleman
 Tryggve Olafsson, Norse Viking king 
 Wang, empress of the Song Dynasty (b. 942)

References